Tytthoscincus aesculeticola  is a species of skink. It is endemic to Borneo and is currently known from Sarawak and Sabah (East Malaysia).

References

aesculeticola
Endemic fauna of Borneo
Endemic fauna of Malaysia
Reptiles of Malaysia
Reptiles described in 2001
Taxa named by Robert F. Inger
Taxa named by Maklarin Lakim
Taxa named by Paul Yambun
Reptiles of Borneo